The Mr. Colorado Basketball honor recognizes the top boys’ high school basketball player in the state of Colorado. The trademarked award has been presented annually since 1993 by The Denver Post to the player of the year selected from the best players in each of the five high school divisions.

Award winners

Schools with multiple winners

References

Col
High school sports in Colorado
Awards established in 1993
Lists of people from Colorado
Colorado sports-related lists